Lydia Oulmou (born 2 February 1986) is an Algerian international volleyball player, playing as middle blocker.

She was in the Algerian squad that went to the 2008 Summer Olympics.

She captained the Algerian team at the 2012 Summer Olympics.

Club information
Current club:     Hainaut Volley ( 2012- )
Previous club:   Istres Volleyball (2009-2012)
Previous club:  Melun Val de Seine La Rochette Volley-Ball (2008-2009)
Previous club:   Istres Volleyball (2005-2008)
Debut club:       NC Bejaia (1998-2005)

Statistics 2009-2012

References

  LNV player page

1986 births
Living people
Volleyball players at the 2008 Summer Olympics
Volleyball players at the 2012 Summer Olympics
Olympic volleyball players of Algeria
Competitors at the 2009 Mediterranean Games
Algerian women's volleyball players
Volleyball players from Béjaïa
Algerian expatriates in France
Middle blockers
Expatriate volleyball players in France
Mediterranean Games competitors for Algeria
21st-century Algerian women
20th-century Algerian women